The Turning Point is a 2022 Italian film directed by Riccardo Antonaroli, written by Roberto Cimpanelli and Gabriele Scarfone and starring Andrea Lattanzi, Brando Pacitto and Ludovica Martino.

Cast 
 Andrea Lattanzi
 Brando Pacitto
 Ludovica Martino
 Chabeli Sastre
 Claudio Bigagli
 Marcello Fonte
 Cristian Di Sante
 Tullio Sorrentino
 Filippo Contri
 Max Malatesta

References

External links
 
 

2022 films
Italian drama films
2020s Italian-language films
Italian-language Netflix original films